Loud is an English and Scottish surname.

Persons
Notable people with this surname include:

Eugene F. Loud (1847–1908), U.S. Representative from California
George A. Loud (1852–1925), American politician
Graham Loud (born 1953), British historian
Hulda Barker Loud (1844-?), American newspaper editor
John J. Loud (1844–1916), American inventor
Lance Loud (1951–2001), American television personality, magazine columnist, and performer
Marguerite St. Leon Loud (1812-1889), American poet and writer
May Hallowell Loud (1860–1916), American painter

Pseudonyms
 Lorraine Crosby (born 1960), British singer whose stagename is "Mrs. Loud"

Fictional
The following main characters from The Loud House who were major supporting characters in its spinoff, The Casagrandes:
Lincoln Loud
Lori Loud
Leni Loud
Luna Loud
Luan Loud
Lynn Loud
Lucy Loud
Lana Loud
Lola Loud
Lisa Loud
Lily Loud
Lynn Loud, Sr.
Rita Loud

The following characters from An American Family:
Bill Loud
Pat Loud
Lance Loud
Kevin Robert Loud
Grant Loud
Delilah Ann Loud
Michele Loud

See also
The Loud Family
The Loud House

English-language surnames